Tiger 131 is a German Tiger I heavy tank captured by the British 48th Royal Tank Regiment in Tunisia during World War II. Preserved at The Tank Museum in Bovington in Dorset, England, it is currently the only operational Tiger I in the world.

German service

Known to the Allies as a Tiger I, the German model designation was a Panzerkampfwagen VI, Tiger I (H1), Sd.Kfz. 181. It was built in Kassel, Germany with the hull being constructed by Henschel while the turret was made by Wegmann A. The tank was completed in February 1943. It was shipped to Tunisia between 12 March and 16 April 1943. The tank was assigned to the 504th Schwere Heerespanzerabteilung German heavy tank battalion in Tunisia during the North African Campaign. It was placed in No. 1 Company, No. 3 Platoon, 1 commanders tank, giving it tactical number 131 shown on the turret, by which it has come to be known.

Capture

Knowing that the Allies were preparing a major push toward Tunis, the Germans launched a spoiling attack on the night of 20/21 April 1943. Four points were attacked simultaneously, including a pass on the north side of a hill called Djebel Djaffa. Two Tigers and several other tanks advanced through this pass before dawn, and were gradually driven back during the day. Tiger 131 was hit by three shots from  6-pounders from British Churchill tanks of A Squadron, 4 Troop of the 48th Royal Tank Regiment (RTR). A solid shot hit the Tiger's gun barrel and ricocheted into its turret ring, jamming its traverse, wounding the driver and front gunner and destroying the radio. A second shot hit the turret lifting lug, disabling the gun's elevation device. A third shot hit the loader's hatch, deflecting fragments into the turret. The German crew bailed out, taking their wounded with them and leaving the knocked-out but still driveable and largely intact tank behind. The tank was secured by the British as they captured Djebel Djaffa hill. Tiger 131 was the first intact Tiger tank captured by British forces.

A 2012 article in the Daily Mail followed by a book by Noel Botham and Bruce Montague entitled Catch that Tiger claimed that Major Douglas Lidderdale, the engineering officer who oversaw the return of Tiger 131 to England, was responsible for the capture of Tiger 131 as the leader of a secret mission appointed by Winston Churchill to obtain a Tiger for Allied intelligence.

Though the account has been considered plausible (if only in light of Churchill's reputation for being "hands on" in his dealings with military affairs during wartime) it has been rejected by The Tank Museum as inaccurate. The story as told in the book contradicts Lidderdale's own letters and papers written in the years before his death, in which he stated that he was not personally present when the Tiger was captured.

In April 2019, Dale Oscroft visited the Tank Museum and was struck by the similarity between Tiger 131 and a story told to him by his father John Oscroft, who was part of 2nd Battalion Sherwood Foresters who took point 174 without the promised tank support. After its capture the Germans immediately counter-attacked with tanks including Tigers. John Oscroft was told to hit one Tiger with his PIAT. After crawling forward to get as close as possible, the projectile fired bounced off the Tiger so he did not fire again. By this time, supporting Churchill tanks had arrived and a shot from a Churchill jammed the turret of the Tiger. Based on photographic and documentary evidence, the disabled Tiger was definitely 131 at Gueriat el Atach ("Point 174") during an attack on 2nd Battalion Sherwood Foresters on 24 April 1943. The Tiger was struck by a Churchill of either 142 Regiment Royal Armoured Corps or 48 RTR, which were supporting the Foresters, and abandoned. This confirms that the Tiger at Djebel Djaffa on 21 April was not 131.

Preservation

Tiger 131 was repaired with parts from other destroyed Tigers and inspected to judge its performance. It was displayed in Tunis and formally inspected there by King George VI and Winston Churchill. The tank was sent to England in October 1943 where it was displayed as a trophy at various locations to raise wartime morale before it was subjected to extensive testing and evaluation by the School of Tank Technology who produced detailed reports on its construction. The captured tank was transferred to The Tank Museum by the British Ministry of Supply on 25 September 1951 where it was given the accession number 2351 (later E1951.23).

In 1990, the tank was removed from display at the museum for restoration by the museum and the Army Base Repair Organisation. The restoration involved an almost complete disassembly of the tank. The Maybach HL230 engine from the museum's Tiger II was installed as the Tiger's original Maybach HL210 had been cut into cross sections for display. A modern fire-suppressant system was added to the engine compartment, the only other significant alteration. The wear and performance of the refitted Tiger engine was studied by metallurgists to explore the alloys and performance of WWII German manufacturing.

In December 2003, Tiger 131 returned to the museum with a working engine, making it the only working Tiger tank in the world and the most popular exhibit at the museum. Further work and repainting in period colours completed the restoration in 2012, for a total cost quoted at £80,000.

This tank was used in the 2014 film Fury, the first time a real Tiger has appeared in a feature film since They Were Not Divided (1950).

See also
Battle of Longstop Hill

References

External links

The Tank Museum Bovington, England

World War II tanks of Germany
Individual tanks
Tunisian campaign